is a passenger railway station on the Kawagoe Line in located in Nishi-ku, Saitama, Saitama Prefecture, Japan, operated by East Japan Railway Company (JR East).

Lines
Services operate every 20 minutes during the daytime.

Station layout
The station has two side platforms serving two tracks. The station entrance was previously located on the south side only, with the platforms connected by a footbridge, but a new north entrance was added in March 2014 as part of a scheme to completely rebuild the station with the ticket barriers located on the second floor, above the platforms, and allowing free passage between the north and south sides of the tracks. The station is staffed.

Platforms

History
The station opened on 22 July 1940 in what was then the village of Sashiōgi in Kita-Adachi District, Saitama. The line was electrified on 30 September 1985, from which date through-running began to and from the Saikyo Line. With the privatization of Japanese National Railways (JNR) on 1 April 1987, the station came under the control of JR East.

Work to rebuild the station started in 2012, and the new north entrance to the station was opened on 9 March 2014. Station rebuilding was completed during fiscal 2014, including a new station forecourt on the north side.

Passenger statistics
In fiscal 2019, the station was used by an average of 10,761 passengers daily (boarding passengers only). The passenger figures for previous years are as shown below.

Surrounding area

North
 Sashiogi Hospital
 Shumei Eiko High School
 Ageo Tachibana High School
 Akiha Shrine

South
 Mamiya Library
 Omiya Musashino High School
 Nishiasuma Park
Tsuchiya Junior High School, Saitama City
Musashino Bank, Sashiogi Branch
Saitama Branch, Hanno Shinkin Bank

See also
 List of railway stations in Japan

References

External links

Sashiōgi Station information (JR East) 

Railway stations in Saitama Prefecture
Kawagoe Line
Stations of East Japan Railway Company
Railway stations in Saitama (city)
Railway stations in Japan opened in 1940